Glauco was the lead ship of her class of two submarines ordered by the Portuguese government, but taken over and completed for the  (Royal Italian Navy) during the 1930s.

Design and description
The Glauco-class submarines were improved versions of the preceding . They displaced  surfaced and  submerged. Their crew numbered 58 officers and enlisted men.

For surface running, the boats were powered by two  diesel engines, each driving one propeller shaft. When submerged each propeller was driven by a  electric motor. They could reach  on the surface and  underwater.

The boats were armed with eight internal  torpedo tubes, four each in the bow and stern for which they carried a total of 14 torpedoes. They were also armed with two  deck guns, one each fore and aft of the conning tower, for combat on the surface. The anti-aircraft armament consisted of one or two  machine guns.

Service
Glauco was built by CRDA in its Trieste shipyard. The submarine had initially been ordered in 1931, but was acquired by the Italians when Portugal cancelled the order. She was launched in 1935, and saw action in the Spanish Civil War and the Second World War. Glauco was badly damaged by the British destroyer HMS Wishart and scuttled by her own crew on 27 June 1941, west of Gibraltar.

Notes

References
 
 

Glauco-class submarines
World War II submarines of Italy
1935 ships